The 2003–04 Karnataka State Film Awards were presented by Government of Karnataka to felicitate the best of Kannada Cinema released for 2003–04. The awards were announced on 1 January 2005 and presented on 16 July in Ambedkar Bhavan, Bangalore.

Lifetime achievement award

Jury 
A nine-member committee headed by P. H. Vishwanath, a noted director, made the selections.
Of the 26 categories listed, there were no entries for the children and sub-regional sections.

Karnataka government increases the prize money from the existing Rs.20000 to Rs.1 lakh and for the rest of the categories it has been hiked to Rs.50000.

Film Awards

Other Awards

References

External links

Karnataka State Film Awards
2004 Indian film awards